Najma Mehboob (1949 – 6 December 1983) was a Pakistani film and TV actress. She mostly played character and mother roles in dramas and films both in Urdu and Punjabi languages. She died in a train accident during a film shoot in 1983.

Early life 
Najma was born in 1949 in Rawalpindi, Pakistan. Initially, she worked in stage plays.

Career 
Then, she came to television in 1969 with a drama Haathi Daant telecast from Pakistan Television, Lahore. Afterward, she appeared in several individual television dramas and serials. She also acted in 82 films in which, the first one was Geo Dhola (1969) and Nazak Rishtay (1987) was the last.

Personal life 
Najma was married to TV producer Muhammad Nisar Hussain and had one child with him.

Death
On 6 December 1983, she died at Lahore after being hit by a running train during the shooting for a Punjabi film Rickshaw Driver while she was trying to save a child.

Filmography

Television series

Film

Awards and nominations

References

External links
 

1949 births
20th-century Pakistani actresses
Actresses in Punjabi cinema
1983 deaths
People from Rawalpindi
Actresses in Urdu cinema
Pakistani film actresses
Actresses in Pashto cinema
PTV Award winners
Pakistani stage actresses
Pakistani television actresses